Okanoyama Yoshiro (born 3 November 1935 as Kiichiro Yamabe) is a former sumo wrestler from Yakage, Okayama, Japan. He made his professional debut in May 1955 and reached the top division in March 1962. His highest rank was maegashira 5. He left the sumo world upon retirement from active competition in January 1965.

Career record
The Kyushu tournament was first held in 1957, and the Nagoya tournament in 1958.

See also
Glossary of sumo terms
List of past sumo wrestlers
List of sumo tournament second division champions

References

1935 births
Living people
Japanese sumo wrestlers
Sumo people from Okayama Prefecture